Michael Andrew Carr (born 6 December 1983 in Crewe, England) is an English former footballer.

Career
Carr has previously played for Macclesfield Town, Northwich Victoria, Morecambe and Kidderminster Harriers . He has been capped seven times for England at semi-professional level, scoring one goal. In his time at Northwich Michael was known for his terrific engine and box to box midfield play which gave him the status as a fans favourite, this then led to interest from football league clubs. He then eventually left Vics to sign for Morecambe in a deal which would see Carr go full-time. After his move Carr found a regular starting place in the side hard to come by and this led to a months loan at former club Northwich, despite returning to Morecambe Carr was released from his contract and snapped up by Kidderminster Harriers. After Harriers decided not to retain his services at the end of the 08–09 season due to financial cutbacks Carr was found looking for a club. On 9 July 2009 Carr signed for Stalybridge Celtic and linked up with former boss Steve Burr. Carr then joined Nantwich Town. In July 2011 it was announced that he had signed for FC United of Manchester of the Northern Premier League Premier Division where he stayed until he left the club at the beginning of December. He then signed for Stafford Rangers FC on 3 December 2011. He made his Stafford debut on Wednesday 7 December 2011 vs Witton Albion in the Dootson Cup (Evo-Stik North League Cup), and scored after just 12 minutes with a header.

References

^ "Fairclough names National squad".

https://www.youtube.com/watch?v=ZTDxG9kS37I&feature=channel

https://www.youtube.com/watch?v=XJnkgVLfrMU

https://www.youtube.com/watch?v=R_sm9nCuB-M

External links
^

1983 births
Living people
Sportspeople from Crewe
English footballers
Association football defenders
Macclesfield Town F.C. players
Northwich Victoria F.C. players
Morecambe F.C. players
Kidderminster Harriers F.C. players
Stalybridge Celtic F.C. players
Nantwich Town F.C. players
F.C. United of Manchester players
Stafford Rangers F.C. players
Kidsgrove Athletic F.C. players
Alsager Town F.C. players
English Football League players
National League (English football) players
Association football utility players
England semi-pro international footballers
Northern Premier League players